Frank Frederick Barberich (February 3, 1882 – May 1, 1965) was a pitcher in Major League Baseball who played for the Boston Doves (1907) and Boston Red Sox (1910). Barberich was a switch-hitter and threw right-handed.

References

External links

Retrosheet

Boston Doves players
Boston Red Sox players
Major League Baseball pitchers
Baseball players from New York (state)
1882 births
1965 deaths
Lawrence Colts players
Worcester Busters players
Providence Grays (minor league) players
Montreal Royals players
Newark Indians players
Binghamton Bingoes players
People from Elmhurst, Queens